William Ayre (1782 or 1783–April 14, 1855) was a teacher in Nova Scotia, Canada.

Born in Ireland, William Ayre taught in the Antigonish area until 1835, when he moved to Port Hood, Cape Breton Island. Some short time later, Ayre's teaching license was withdrawn due to drunkenness. Ayre continued to teach in Cape Breton without a license or financial support from the government. He petitioned repeatedly to have his license reinstated.

In 1837 Ayre built a "Seminary" in Mabou. The school included a library, a school room and accommodation for 14 boarding students. However Ayre ran out of money and the school was known locally as "Ayre's Folly".

In 1841 Ayre's license was finally reinstated. He continued to teach until 1854 when he retired, moving to Halifax. He died the next year.

References 

1780s births
1855 deaths
Canadian educators
Colony of Nova Scotia people
Irish emigrants to pre-Confederation Nova Scotia